.accountants is a generic top-level domain (gTLD) in the Domain Name System of the internet. It was originally delegated to Knob Town, LLC, c/o Donuts LLC on 02 May 2014. On 23 March 2018, .accountants and 195 other domains were transferred to its current sponsor, Binky Moon, LLC, c/o Donuts LLC.

Reference section 

Generic top-level domains